Patrika TV is a Hindi-language 24/7 News and Social television channel, owned by PNN.

References

Tata Sky:- 1184 
DEN:-  332
RM:- 125
Hathway:- 784

Hindi-language television channels in India
Television channels and stations established in 2015
Hindi-language television stations
Television stations in India
2017 establishments in Rajasthan